Bodianus albotaeniatus, the Hawaiian hogfish, is a species of wrasse native to the Hawaiian Islands. It is of minor importance to local commercial fisheries and is also popular as a game fish. It can also be found in the aquarium trade.

Although considered a subspecies of Bodianus bilunulatus in the past, it is now treated as a distinct species in its own right.

References

albotaeniatus
Taxa named by Achille Valenciennes
Fish described in 1839